Alexander Anderson (12 May 1858 – 7 September 1936) was an Irish physicist and President of Queen's College Galway, now the University of Galway, from 1899 until 1934. In electrical engineering he is known for Anderson's bridge. He is credited with being the first physicist to consider black holes as real physical entities, in a 1920 paper.

Early life and education
Alexander Anderson was born on 12 May 1858, the son of Daniel Anderson, of Camus, Coleraine, County Londonderry. He was educated at Queen's College Galway, where he won a first-year scholarship in the Science Division of the Faculty of Arts and the Sir Robert Peel Prize in Geometry in 1876. He was awarded gold medals on the results of his B.A. examination in 1880, and his M.A. examination in 1881. He then won first place in an open examination for a scholarship to Sidney Sussex College at Cambridge from which he graduated BA (6th wrangler) in 1884. He was later awarded MA in 1888.

Career
In 1885, Anderson returned to Queen's College Galway, where he was appointed Professor of Natural Philosophy, a post he held until 1934. He was elected a Fellow of the Royal University of Ireland in 1886, and a Fellow of Sidney Sussex College, Cambridge, in 1891. He was appointed President of Queen's College Galway on the resignation of Professor W. J. M. Starkie in 1899.

Anderson was conferred with an honorary L.L.D. by the University of Glasgow in 1901. He served as a Senator of both the Royal University of Ireland, and its successor, the National University of Ireland, and as a member of the Dublin Commissioners appointed under the Irish Universities Act of 1908. He was Vice-Chancellor of the National University of Ireland in 1915 and 1920.

He retired as President of the College in 1934, and died in September 1936.

Personal life
Anderson married Miss Emily Binns, of Galway.

References

Obituary, The Irish Times, 7 September 1936
History, National University of Ireland, Galway

1858 births
1936 deaths
Academics of the University of Galway
Presidents of the University of Galway
Alumni of Sidney Sussex College, Cambridge
Fellows of Sidney Sussex College, Cambridge
Irish physicists
People from Coleraine, County Londonderry
People from County Galway